R. John Hansman (born October 13, 1954) is an American physicist currently the T. Wilson Professor of Aeronautics & Astronautics at Massachusetts Institute of Technology and an Elected Fellow of the American Institute of Aeronautics and Astronautics.

Hansman was elected a member of the National Academy of Engineering in 2013 for the development of aviation display and alerting systems for air safety.

Publications 

 Measurement of ice accretion using ultrasonic pulse-echo techniques
 Heat transfer on accreting ice surfaces

References

Living people
MIT School of Engineering faculty
21st-century American physicists
1954 births